State Highway 123 (abbreviated SH-123) is a state highway in the U.S. state of Oklahoma. SH-123 has no lettered spur routes.

Route description
SH-123 begins east of Barnsdall, Oklahoma, in Osage County at State Highway 11. It heads north to the Woolaroc Museum before turning northeast. As it approaches the Washington County line, it turns northward to parallel it. SH-123 then enters western Bartlesville, overlapping US-60 for one-fifth of a mile (0.3 km). SH-123 briefly runs east–west before turning north and leaving Bartlesville. It then heads due north until it changes course and runs due east to Dewey, where it terminates at US-75.

Junction list

References

External links
SH-123 at OKHighways
Highway 123 Episode from Two Wheel Oklahoma

123
Transportation in Osage County, Oklahoma
Transportation in Washington County, Oklahoma